The 2002 Dartmouth Big Green football team was an American football team that represented Dartmouth College during the 2002 NCAA Division I-AA football season. The Big Green tied for second-to-last in the Ivy League.

In its 11th season under head coach John Lyons, the team compiled a 3–7 record and was outscored 295 to 247. Kevin Noone was the team captain.

The Big Green's 1–6 conference record tied for sixth in the Ivy League standings. Dartmouth was outscored 200 to 151 by Ivy opponents. 

Dartmouth played its home games at Memorial Field on the college campus in Hanover, New Hampshire.

Schedule

References

Dartmouth
Dartmouth Big Green football seasons
Dartmouth Football